Lappeh Zanak (also Romanized as Lappeh Zang, Lapeh Sang, and Lapeh Zang) is a village in Ghaniabad Rural District, in the Central District of Ray County, Tehran Province, Iran. At the 2006 census, its population was 628, in 201 families.

References 

Populated places in Ray County, Iran